Philip Meninsky (born 1919 in Fulham, England, died in 2007) was the son of Bernard Meninsky. Despite an early passion for art, at his father's wish, he initially trained as an accountant, before being called up for National Service.

After a first posting to Scotland, he was then sent to the Far East where he was captured in 1942 after the fall of Singapore.

He spent the next three years working on the Death Railway where he recorded the lives of POWs by secretly making detailed drawings of camp life. These drawings were subsequently used as evidence in the trials of war criminals.

At one point, rendered skeletal by starvation, he developed tropical ulcers on his legs, and was transferred to Chunkai hospital camp, where his limbs were saved from amputation by Edward Dunlop and Major Arthur Moon.

His work from this period is largely held by the Imperial War Museum in London, England, but there is at least one in the State Library of Victoria in Australia, and the Australian War Memorial.

Together with the works of Jack Bridger Chalker, Ashley George Old and Ronald Searle these drawings and paintings form a unique record of this dark time in human history.

Old and Meninsky were reunited in 1995 after 50 years as guests of the Imperial War Museum for an exhibition Victory in the Far East   – held 15 August to 15 December 1995.

References

External links
 Surrey Comet Obituary

World War II artists
World War II prisoners of war held by Japan
1919 births
2007 deaths
British war artists
Imperial War Museum
Burma Railway prisoners
British people of Jewish descent